The 1992–93 Cypriot Fourth Division was the 8th season of the Cypriot fourth-level football league. The championship was split into three geographical groups, representing the Districts of Cyprus. The winners were:
 Nicosia-Keryneia Group: Ethnikos Latsion FC
 Larnaca-Famagusta Group: Fotiakos Frenarou
 Limassol-Paphos Group: APEI Ipsona

The three winners were promoted to the 1993–94 Cypriot Third Division. 28 teams were relegated to regional leagues since the 1993–94 Cypriot Fourth Division was held as a single division.

See also
 Cypriot Fourth Division
 1992–93 Cypriot First Division
 1992–93 Cypriot Cup

Cypriot Fourth Division seasons
Cyprus
1992–93 in Cypriot football